Raigo Toompuu (born 17 July 1981) is an Estonian athlete. He competed for Estonia in shot put at the 2012 Summer Olympics.

Competition record

References

Estonian male shot putters
Athletes (track and field) at the 2012 Summer Olympics
Olympic athletes of Estonia
1981 births
Living people
Sportspeople from Haapsalu
Competitors at the 2009 Summer Universiade